All or Nothing is the sixth studio album by American rapper Fat Joe. It was released on June 14, 2005, by Terror Squad and Atlantic Records.

The album received generally positive reviews and debuted at number six on the US Billboard 200, selling 106,500 copies in the first week.

Critical reception

Steve 'Flash' Juon of RapReviews found the record to be much more than its first two singles, praising the beats for emitting a fiery energy throughout the track listing and Joe's performance for being similar to The Notorious B.I.G. in terms of delivering both crossover radio singles and hardcore bangers, concluding that "Fat Joe is nobody's joke any more - he goes for "All or Nothing" on this album and in doing so even serves notice to competitors for that dapper throne that it's not 50's to own. I think it's safe to say he doubled up on the bet." Andy Kellman of AllMusic said it was similar to previous projects that Joe had done in the early 2000s and gave note to Cool & Dre's work being up to par with their more well-known contemporaries, concluding that "While [Fat] Joe has yet to come up with a landmark album, he also hasn't released a dud since his 1993 debut." Rolling Stones Christian Hoard was concerned about the vast producers and guest artists throughout the album but said that Joe's macho persona and no-frills lyricism had enough variations to carry it. Spin credited the record for Just Blaze's production on "Safe 2 Say" and the Nelly collaboration "Get It Poppin'", calling it "A best-yet mix of the New York hardcore hip-hop that keeps this 50 Cent rival vital and the radio-friendly floor fillers that pad his bank account."

A writer for HipHopDX commended the album for having standout party bangers and street tracks courtesy of Cool & Dre but felt the overall package was below the standards Joe set for himself against 50 Cent and G-Unit, concluding that "With the diverse variety of production and A-List features on All or Nothing it's safe to say that it could have been so, so much more." Jim During of IGN saw promise in the record because of Just Blaze and Cool & Dre's contributions in the first-half, and Mase and Eminem's guest verses on the "Lean Back" remix, but said it loses that energy when it moves towards the crossover singles. Entertainment Weekly writer Nick Marino commented on the lack of cohesiveness in Joe's musicianship, saying "he can’t quite integrate his machismo and vulnerability into seamless artistry." He concluded that "the result is a choppy gangsta party record, laced with sweetness." Dorian Lynskey of The Guardian felt the track listing was nothing more than a typical rapper's checklist, and found Joe's rhymes on "Lean Back (Remix)" to be "workmanlike plod" compared to Eminem's, calling All or Nothing a "makeweight mainstream hip hop album".
The album was originally slated to be titled: "Things of that Nature", but owing to his dispute wity 50 Cent, changed the album to "All or Nothing".

Commercial performance
All or Nothing debuted at number six on the US Billboard 200 chart, 106,000 copies in its first week. This became Joe's second US top-ten debut. The album also debuted at number two on the US Top R&B/Hip-Hop Albums chart, becoming Joe's fourth top-ten album on this chart. As of July 2006, the album has sold 293,000 copies in the United States, according to Nielsen SoundScan.

Track listing

Charts

Weekly charts

Year-end charts

References

2005 albums
Fat Joe albums
Atlantic Records albums
Albums produced by Timbaland
Albums produced by Scott Storch
Albums produced by Swizz Beatz
Albums produced by Just Blaze
Albums produced by Cool & Dre
Albums produced by the Runners
Albums produced by Lil Jon
Albums produced by DJ Khaled